New Brunswick Bible Institute (NBBI), is a conservative, evangelical Bible college that exists to educate Christian students in a thorough knowledge of the Bible as well as provide them with practical vocational training for ministry.

Location 
The  NBBI campus is located in rural Victoria Corner, New Brunswick, Canada and is situated along the western bank of the scenic Saint John River between the towns of Hartland and Woodstock and just  from the international border with the United States at Houlton, Maine.

History 
New Brunswick Bible Institute traces its historic roots back to the ministry of nineteenth century evangelist D. L. Moody, whose passion for equipping Christians with a practical Bible education influenced a generation of pioneers who carried that same desire across North America and Europe. NBBI was part of that movement when it was founded in 1944 by John Parschauer and a group of Christian men who saw the need in the Canadian Maritime provinces for a Bible-centered school that could train young men and women and send them forth to evangelize.  The school began that fall with an enrollment of ten students in its three-year Biblical and Theological Studies Program. Parschauer later went on to start the Bibelschule Brake in Lemgo, Germany in 1959.

In 1947, the New Brunswick Bible Institute was officially recognized by the government as a "school for training young men and women to do the work of the ministry" and was granted incorporated status by the New Brunswick Legislative Assembly.

In the early 1950s, with the enrollment steadily increasing, new dormitories and a meeting center were built to accommodate student needs and host the general public for special meetings and conferences. The campus facilities were further expanded in the 1970s with the completion of a new dining facility, men's dormitory and the Open Bible Student Center (renamed the Kenneth M. Robins Student Centre in 2001) which provided space for new classrooms, administration offices, a chapel and gymnasium. Extensive renovations and projects have been conducted over the years and today the campus has a total of 22 buildings in use.

In the fall of 1991, New Brunswick Bible Institute added a one-year Associate Program and a four-year Advanced Biblical Ministries Program to complement its core three-year Biblical and Theological Studies curriculum.

In 2009, NBBI began offering a Bachelor of Theology degree to all graduates of the Advanced Biblical Ministries Program through a networking agreement with Covington Theological Seminary of Rossville, GA.

Today 
New Brunswick Bible Institute has hundreds of graduates who are currently serving in churches and mission organizations all over the globe. A survey conducted in 2001 among the fourth year graduates of NBBI, indicated that 70% were in full-time ministry.  The school lists at least 64 countries in which NBBI alumni have been involved in Christian service. There were 103 students enrolled in its programs of study for the 2010-2011 school year.  The school employs 28 full and part-time staff and faculty and is governed by a Board of Directors.

The school teaches a literal interpretation of the Book of Genesis, including young-earth creationism and offers sex-segregated courses, such as "Principles for the Godly Woman". Divorcees and those married to divorcees will not be accepted into their day school program.

References

External links 
 

Colleges in New Brunswick
Evangelical seminaries and theological colleges in Canada